Sing a Song for You: Tribute to Tim Buckley is a double CD studio album performed by various artists in tribute to 1960s musician Tim Buckley. The album is named after a Buckley song of the same name which is also the first track on the first disc. Tim Buckley died of an accidental overdose in 1975.

Track listing
All songs by Tim Buckley except:
by Tim Buckley and Larry Beckett †

Disc 1
"Sing a Song for You" performed by Moose - 3:30
"Morning Glory"† performed by Simon Raymonde, Anneli Drecker - 4:19
"Dream Letter" performed by Brendan Perry - 4:20
"Love from Room 109 at the Islander" performed by Mojave 3 - 4:30
"Because of You"† performed by The Friendly Science Orchestra - 5:36
"Cafe" performed by Mark Lanegan - 5:38
"Buzzin' Fly" performed by Shelleyan Orphan - 5:39
"I Woke Up"† performed by Mike Johnson - 3:06
"Blue Melody" performed by Cousteau - 5:20

Disc2
"I Must've Been Blind" performed by Heather Duby - 5:34
"Sweet Surrender" performed by Dot Allison - 6:01
"Pleasant Street" performed by Geneva - 9:15
"Strange Feelin'" performed by Lilys - 3:27
"Happy Time" performed by The Mad Scene - 3:54
"Phantasmagoria in Two" performed by Neil Halstead - 4:37
"Once I Was" performed by Tram - 3:56
"Song to the Siren"† performed by The Czars - 7:50

Personnel

Performers
Mike Johnson - Vocals, Guitar
Ida Akesson - Piano, Hammond Organ
Dot Allison - keyboards, vocals, Producer, Engineer, Liner Notes
Paul Anderson - Acoustic Guitar, Harmonica, Arranger, Electric Guitar, Keyboards, Vocals
Brent Arnold - Organ, Arranger, Electric Piano, Vibraphone
Nick Avery - percussion, drums
Robin Brown - Guitar
Cody Burns - Guitar
Douglas Caskie - Drums
Jen Charowhas - Violin
Michael Conroy - Bass guitar, Guitar, Strings, Keyboards, Vocals, Vibraphone
Mick Conroy - Bass guitar, Guitar, Strings, Keyboards, Vocals, Vibraphone
Cousteau - Performer, Producer, Liner Notes
Caroline Crawley - Vocals, Voices, Liner Notes
The Czars - Performer, Producer
Steven Dora - Guitar
Anneli Drecker - Performer
Heather Duby - Vocals, Producer
Stuart Evans - Guitar
Alan Forrester - Mellotron
The Friendly Science Orchestra - Performer
Geneva - Producer, Performer
Rachel Goswell - Bass guitar
Keith Graham - Bass
John Grant - Piano, Vocals, Voices
Roger Green - Guitar
Gary Griffiths - Violin
Neil Halstead - Acoustic Guitar, Guitar, Vocals, Voices, Producer, Mellotron
Paul Hammond - Organ, Guitar
Kurt Heasley - Vocals, Producer, Baritone Guitar
Mark Howell - Trumpet
Irving Joseph - Keyboards
Zeke Keeble - Drums
Hamish Kilgour - Guitar, Vocals
Mark Lanegan - Vocals
Lilys - Performer
Jeff Linsenmaier - Drums
Michael Littleton - Bass, Vocals, Megaphone
The Mad Scene - Performer
Ian Masters - Guitar, Vocals, Koto, Singer, Musical Saw, Classical Guitar, Liner Notes, Programmed Percussion
Adam McCollom - Bass
Ian McCutcheon - Percussion, Drums, Electric Guitar
Liam McKahey - Vocals
Andy Monley - Guitar
Andrew Montgomery - Vocals
Davey Ray Moor - Piano
Ian Painter - Bass
John Parish - Slide Guitar
Joe Peet - Bass
Brendan Perry - Keyboards, Vocals, Voices, Producer
Simon Raymonde - Guitar, Piano, Arranger, backing vocals, Producer, Liner Notes, Mixing
David Rothon - Pedal Steel Guitar
Simon Rowe - Electric Guitar
Michael Shilling - Drums
Lisa Siegel - Organ, Guitar, Vocals
Paul Sinclair - Hammond Organ
Jules Singleton - Violin
Lisa Sutton - Art Direction
Mitsuo Tate - Engineer
Mick Tedder - Bass guitar, Guitar
Tram - Performer
Danny Tunick - Drums, Vocals, Vibraphone
Craig Vear - Percussion, Drums
Boris Williams - Drums
Russell Yates - Bass guitar, Guitar, Strings, Keyboards, Vocals, Vibraphone

Album personnel
Paul Anderson - Liner Notes
Martin Bisi - Producer, Engineer
Mario Casilio - Producer
Evan Cohen - Executive Producer
Phil Ek - Producer
Robin Evans - Producer, Mixing
Giles Hall - Programming, Producer
Tim Holmes - Engineer, Mixing
Jem - String Arrangements
Gareth Parton - Producer
Tristan Powell - Producer
Dave Schultz - Mastering
Kevin Suggs - Producer

References

External links
Tim Buckley official website

Tribute albums
2000 compilation albums